Marcel Sîrba (born 1 October 1957) is a Romanian boxer. He competed in the men's light middleweight event at the 1980 Summer Olympics. At the 1980 Summer Olympics, he lost to Leo Vainonen of Sweden.

References

1957 births
Living people
Romanian male boxers
Olympic boxers of Romania
Boxers at the 1980 Summer Olympics
Place of birth missing (living people)
Light-middleweight boxers